Ex-Rad (or Ex-RAD; recilisib sodium (INN, USAN); development code ON 01210.Na) is an experimental drug being developed by Onconova Therapeutics and the U.S. Department of Defense. It is being studied as a radiation protection agent. Chemically, it is the sodium salt of 4-carboxystyryl-4-chlorobenzylsulfone.

Clinical trials
The results of two Phase I clinical studies in healthy human volunteers indicate that subcutaneously injected Ex-Rad is safe and well tolerated, with "no evidence of systemic side effects". A study in mice demonstrated the efficacy of Ex-Rad by increasing the survival rate of mice exposed to typically lethal whole-body irradiation. The study tested oral and parenteral administration of Ex-Rad for both pre- and post-exposure radiomitigation.

Research on Ex-Rad has involved collaboration with the Armed Forces Radiobiology Research Institute (AFRRI), the Department of Biochemistry and Molecular & Cellular Biology at Georgetown University, Long Island University's Arnold & Marie Schwartz College of Pharmacy, and the Department of Oncological Sciences at the Mt. Sinai School of Medicine.

Mechanism of action
Onconova reports that Ex-Rad protects cells exposed to radiation against DNA damage, and that the drug's mechanism of action does not involve scavenging free radicals or arresting the cell cycle. Instead, they claim it employs a "novel mechanism" involving "intracellular signaling, damage sensing, and DNA repair pathways". Ex-RAD is a chlorobenzylsulfone derivative that works after free radicals have damaged DNA. Onconova CEO Ramesh Kumar believes this is a better approach than trying to scavenge free radicals. “Free radicals are very short-lived, and so the window of opportunity to give a drug is very narrow,” he says. In cell and animal models, Ex-RAD protects hematopoietic and gastrointestinal tissues from radiation injury when given either before or after exposure.

See also
CBLB502 (Entolimod), a compound being studied for its ability to suppresses apoptotic cell death in hematopoietic and gastrointestinal cells.
Amifostine (WR2721), the first selective-target and broad-spectrum radioprotector, upregulates DNA repair
Filgrastim (Neupogen), a hematopoietic countermeasure of acute radiation syndrome (ARS)
Pegfilgrastim (Neulasta), longer acting than its parent, filgrastim
Sargramostim (leukine), similar in use to filgrastim
N-Acetylcysteine, protects against DNA damage, suggested to be comparable to amifostine
Thrombomodulin
Activated protein C
Chelation therapy, a countermeasure for treating internal radio-isotope contamination
DPTA, a chelation agent used to eliminate actinides that have been ingested, one of three U.S. Food and Drug Administration (FDA) radioprotectants stockpiled
Prussian blue/radiogardase, a chelation agent to treat radio-Cesium and thallium consumption, one of three the FDA radioprotectants stockpiled
Potassium iodide, a prophylactic drug recommended before entering radioiodine environments, one of three FDA radioprotectants stockpiled
Kojic acid 
Hyaluronan
Petkau effect

References

Radiation health effects
Radiobiology
Drugs with unknown mechanisms of action
Experimental drugs
Chloroarenes
Sulfones
Benzoates